Abbott Laboratories v. Gardner, 387 U.S. 136 (1967), was a case heard before the United States Supreme Court. Abbott Laboratories held that drug companies were not prohibited by the ripeness doctrine from challenging a U.S. Food and Drug Administration (FDA) regulation requiring a prescription drug's generic name to appear on all related printed materials. The government argued that the case was not ripe because the regulation had yet to be enforced. That argument failed as the Court found the issues to be fit for judicial resolution, and that the drug companies would experience substantial hardship if denied a pre-enforcement challenge to the statute. Prosecution for non-compliance was likely, civil and criminal penalties could be imposed, and the drug companies would suffer reputational damage if required to violate the regulation before challenging it in court.

Facts 
The action was brought by individuals and associations accounting for more than 90% of the prescription drug industry. Specifically, the petitioners challenged the decision by the Commissioner of Food and Drug to promulgate the "established name" rule pursuant to a statute granted by Congress. After inviting and considering comments submitted by interested parties, the Commissioner established the following rule:

If the label or labeling of a prescription drug bears a proprietary name or designation for the drug or any ingredient thereof, the established name, if such there be, corresponding, to such proprietary name or designation, shall accompany each appearance of such proprietary name or designation.

External links 

 Supreme Court favors reviewability of administrative actions – Abbott Laboratories et al. v. Gardner, 87 S. Ct. 1507, 387 U.S. 136 (1967)

United States Supreme Court cases
United States Supreme Court cases of the Warren Court
United States administrative case law
1967 in United States case law
Abbott Laboratories
United States ripeness case law